Heinrichsberg is the name of the following:

Places:
 Heinrichsberg, a village in the municipality of Loitsche-Heinrichsberg in Saxony-Anhalt, Germany
 Heinrichsberg (Kilb), a catastral municipality in Lower Austria
 Heinrichsberg (Pittenhart), a village in the municipality of Pittenhart
 Heinrichsberg (Markt Massing), a village in Markt Massing
 Heinrichsberg in Bohemia, the Jindřichova Hora

Hills:
 Heinrichsberg (Spessart), hill near Dörrmorsbach, municipality of Haibach (Unterfranken), Germany
 Heinrichsberg (Jena) ("Am Heinrichsberg" road), Germany
 Heinrichsberg, a hill near Harzgerode, Saxony-Anhalt, Germany, see Heinrichsberg Castle

Castle:
Heinrichsberg Castle in Harzgerode, Saxony-Anhalt, Germany

See also
Heinrichsburg (disambiguation)